Rich in London a.k.a. Very Alive at Ronnie Scotts is a live album by Buddy Rich and his big band, recorded in 1971 at Ronnie Scott's Jazz Club in London.  Not to be confused with the 1980 DRG Buddy Rich Big Band recording, Live at Ronnie Scott's.

Release history 
The US LP release, Rich in London, contains 8 tracks plus a Rich monologue.  The UK release, Very Alive at Ronnie Scotts, is a double LP containing an additional 5 tracks plus more examples of Rich talking to the audience.  Both albums have been re-issued on CD.  The Mosaic Records single CD re-issue of Rich in London includes 4 additional bonus tracks (4 of the "missing" 5 tracks from the UK "Very Alive..." release - all but "Superstar" - but not the additional Rich monologue).

Track listing

Rich in London
LP Side 1
"Dancing Men" (Pat LaBarbera) – 6:41
"The Word" (Don Piestrup) – 6:03
"St. Marks Square (A Special Day)" (LaBarbera) – 4:06
"That's Enough" (Jon Hendricks) – 3:23
"Little Train" (Herbie Phillips) – 6:26
LP Side 2
"Two Bass Hit" (Dizzy Gillespie, John Lewis) – 4:00
"[[(Where Do I Begin?) Love Story|Theme from Love Story]]" (Francis Lai) – 5:50
"Time Being" (Bill Holman) – 12:37
Buddy Rich Speaks – 4:45

Very Alive at Ronnie Scotts
Disc 1
"Moment's Notice" (John Coltrane) – 3:25
"Watson's Walk" (LaBarbera) – 7:28
"St. Marks Square (A Special Day)"
"Little Train"
"Milestones" (Miles Davis) – 5:26
"The Words"
"Dancing Men"
Just Buddy Rich – 5:02
Disc 2
"Superstar" (Andrew Lloyd Webber, Tim Rice) – 3:50
"Love Story"
"In a Mellow Tone" (Duke Ellington) – 5:48
"Two Bass Hit"
Buddy Rich Introduces – 1:21
"That's Enough"
"Time Being"
Buddy Rich Again – 4:47

Personnel 
Brian A. Grivna, alto sax, flute
Jimmy Mosher, alto sax, soprano sax, flute 
Pat LaBarbera, tenor sax, soprano sax, flute
Don Englert, tenor sax, soprano sax, flute
Joe Calo, baritone sax, soprano sax, flute
Lin Biviano, trumpet
Jeff Stout, trumpet
Wayne Naus, trumpet
John DeFlon, trumpet
Bruce Paulson, trombone
Tony DiMaggio, trombone
John Leys, bass trombone
Bob Dogan, piano
Paul Kondziela, bass
Buddy Rich, drums

References 

RCA LSP 4666 (US LP)
RCA DPS 2031 (UK double LP)
BMG 37433 (2005 CD re-issue of Rich in London)
Mosaic 1009 (2007 CD re-issue of Rich in London with 4 bonus tracks)
BGO CD785 (2008 2 CD re-issue of Very Alive at Ronnie Scott's)

Buddy Rich live albums
1972 live albums
Albums recorded at Ronnie Scott's Jazz Club
RCA Records live albums